The Standardbred is an American horse breed best known for its ability in harness racing, where members of the breed compete at either a trot or pace. Developed in North America, the Standardbred is recognized worldwide, and the breed can trace its bloodlines to 18th-century England. They are solid, well-built horses with good dispositions. In addition to harness racing, the Standardbred is used for a variety of equestrian activities, including horse shows and pleasure riding, particularly in the Midwestern and Eastern United States and in Southern Ontario.

History

In the 17th century, the first trotting races were held in the Americas, usually in fields on horses under saddle. However, by the mid-18th century, trotting races were held on official courses, with the horses in harness.   Breeds that have contributed foundation stock to the Standardbred breed included the Narragansett Pacer, Canadian Pacer, Thoroughbred, Norfolk Trotter, Hackney, and Morgan.

The foundation bloodlines of the Standardbred trace to a Thoroughbred foaled in England in 1780 named Messenger.  He was a gray stallion imported to the United States in 1788. He sired a number of flat racing horses, but was best known for his great-grandson, Hambletonian 10, also known as Rysdyk's Hambletonian, foaled in 1849 and considered the foundation sire of the breed and from whom all Standardbreds descend. Hambletonian 10 was out of a dam with Norfolk Trotter breeding, and the mare and foal were purchased by William Rysdyk, a farm hand from New York state, who successfully raced the colt as a three-year-old against other horses. The horse went on to sire 1,331 offspring, 40 of whom trotted a mile in under 2 minutes 30 seconds.

Another influential sire was the Thoroughbred Diomed, born in 1777. Diomed's Thoroughbred grandson American Star, foaled in 1822, was influential in the development of the breed through the mares of his progeny by American Star 14 being bred to Hambletonian 10. When the sport started to gain popularity, more selective breeding was done to produce the faster harness trotter.

The first national Standardbred breed registry was formed in United States in 1879 by the National Association of Trotting Horse Breeders. The name arose due to the "standard" required of breeding stock, to be able to trot or pace a mile within a certain time limit.  Every Standardbred had to be able to trot a mile in less than two minutes and 30 seconds.  Today, many Standardbreds are faster than this original standard, with several pacing the mile within 1 min, 50 sec, and trotters only a few seconds slower than pacers. Slightly different bloodlines are found in trotters than in pacers, though both can trace their heritage back to Hambletonian 10.

Characteristics

Standardbreds tend to be more muscled and longer bodied than the Thoroughbred.  They also are of more placid dispositions, as suits horses whose races involve more strategy and more changes of speed than do Thoroughbred races. Standardbreds are considered people-oriented, easy-to-train horses.

They are generally a bit heavier in build than Thoroughbreds, but have refined, solid legs and powerful shoulders and hindquarters. They are most often bay, brown or  black, although other colors such as chestnut are seen. Gray and roan are also found.

Their heads are refined and straight with  broad foreheads, large nostrils, and shallow mouths. The typical Standardbred body is long, with the withers being well defined, with strong shoulders and the muscles being long and heavy, which helps with the long strides. The neck of the Standardbred is muscular and should be slightly arched, with a length of medium to long. Their legs are muscular and solid, with generally very tough and durable hooves.

Gait 
Individual Standardbreds tend to either trot or pace while racing. Trotters' preferred racing gait is the trot, where the horses' legs move in diagonal pairs; when the right foreleg moves forward, so does the left hind leg, and vice versa. The pace is a two-beat lateral gait; pacers' forelegs move in unison with the hind legs on the same side. However, the breed also is able to perform other horse gaits, including the canter, though this gait is penalized in harness racing.

Pacers still retain the ability to trot and do so regularly; however, they are labeled by the gait they race at. Additionally, some trotters are able to pace, but prefer to race at the trot. Today's Standardbreds race in the same gait for their whole career, with rare exception. And although the gaits are similar, the pace is faster than the trot.

The ability to pace is linked to a single-point mutation in gene DMRT3, which is expressed in the I6 subdivision of spinal cord neurons; this area is responsible for coordinating the locomotor network controlling limb movements. The point mutation causes early termination of the gene by coding for a stop codon, thus altering the function of this transcription factor. Uniquely, both pacing and trotting American Standardbreds are fixed for the DMRT3 variant. This suggest that there is at least one additional genetic variant that controls trotting and pacing in Standardbreds. However, European Standardbreds are not yet fixed for this DMRT3 variant, although homozygous individuals have better performance records.

Breeding Practices 
At the foundation of the United States Trotting Association in 1939, a closed stud book was proposed. The studbook was not officially closed until 1973, however, it is likely that it was effectively closed prior. In 2009, in an effort to reduce the loss of genetic diversity within the breed, the United States Trotting Association capped the studbook for all new sires to 140 mares per year.  This went into effect immediately for trotting stallions, and gradually for pacing stallions.

Today's Standardbreds are commonly bred to like gait type, i.e. trotters are bred to trotters, and pacers are bred to pacers. Although it is possible for trotters to produce a pacer, these gait-specific breeding practices are causing Standardbreds to differentiate into two subpopulations based on gait, more distinct than some breeds.

Health

Developmental orthopedic diseases (DOD) 
Osteochondrosis (OC), osteochondrosis dissecans (OCD), and other related developmental orthopedic diseases (DOD) appear at a high frequency in Standardbreds. OC/OCD is a moderate to highly heritable condition in Standardbreds and similar breeds, and genetic risk factors have been identified. These findings suggest that a change in breeding practices could lower the prevalence within the breed; however, lesions may resolve on their own or can be surgically corrected.

Uses

Harness racing
Standardbreds are known for their skill in harness racing, being the fastest trotting horses in the world. Because of their speed, Standardbreds are often used to upgrade other breeds of harness racers around the world, such as the Orlov Trotter and French Trotter.

In Australia, Canada, New Zealand, the United Kingdom, and the United States, races are held for both trotters and pacers. In continental Europe, all harness races are conducted between trotters. Major races for North American trotters include the Peter Haughton Memorial for two-year-olds, and the World Trotting Derby, Yonkers Trot, Hambletonian, and Kentucky Futurity for three-year-olds. The Hambletonian is sometimes referred to as the "Kentucky Derby of Harness Racing".  The Trotting Triple Crown is made up of the Yonkers Trot, Hambletonian Stakes, and Kentucky Futurity.

Some of the major pacing races in North America include the Woodrow Wilson and Metro Stake for two-year-olds, and the Little Brown Jug, Meadowlands Pace, North America Cup and the Adios Pace for three-year-olds. The Little Brown Jug, the Messenger Stakes, and the Cane Pace comprise the Pacing Triple Crown. Major races in Australia and New Zealand include the New Zealand Trotting Cup, the Miracle Mile Pace and the Inter Dominion series.

In 1968, New Zealand-bred Cardigan Bay became the first Standardbred horse ever to win US$1 million, and the ninth horse to do so worldwide (the first eight were Thoroughbreds). He was popular in the United States, and appeared with Stanley Dancer on The Ed Sullivan Show as the "million dollar horse".

Other uses

Standardbreds are also used in horse shows and for pleasure riding.  They are also popular as light buggy horses for the Amish people, who eschew motorized vehicles.  Many retired Standardbreds find a second career off the track with the help of organizations such as the Standardbred Pleasure Horse Organization.

The breed is quite good at jumping, making them suitable for the sport horse disciplines of hunt seat, show jumping, show hunter, and eventing. The breed is also seen in dressage, and their excellent temperaments make them good trail riding and ranch horses.

In addition, because of the genetics of the breed, they can also be encouraged and trained to perform smooth ambling gaits, notably the rack and the stepping pace. The number of gaited Standardbreds is steadily growing in the United States, with some stud farms dedicated to breeding individuals with this characteristic. Standardbreds are also gaining popularity in Australia as endurance horses, from the 20 km social rides and 40 km training rides, up to the 80 km endurance rides. They are known for their strong and dense bones, suitable conformation and ability to maintain high trotting speeds for extended periods of time comfortably. The kind and manageable temperament of the breed also contributes to its popularity. These features are especially attractive to riders who do not wish to be competitive against the purpose-bred Arabian horses, which are often more difficult and competitive to ride.

References

Sources

External links

USTA breed information and versatility program

Horse breeds
Horse breeds originating in the United States
Standardbreds
Harness racing